The Kanawha darter (Etheostoma kanawhae) is a species of freshwater ray-finned fish, a darter from the subfamily Etheostomatinae, part of the family Percidae, which also contains the perches, ruffes and pikeperches. It is endemic to the southeastern United States.

Geographic distribution
The Kanawha darter is only known to occur in the New River drainage of Virginia and North Carolina.  It inhabits fast-flowing waters in riffles of small and medium rivers over gravel or rubble substrates.

Description
The Kanawha darter can reach a length of  TL though most only reach .

Habitat and biology
The Kanawha darter is found in riffles with a fast flow over gravel and rubble substrates in small to medium rivers, it can also occur in areas with hard bed in Clear streams and rivers with both cold and warm waters. Some males may breed for the first time at 1 year old but most males and all females first breed at 2 years old. The main food of this species is insect larvae.

Taxonomy
The Kanawha darter was first formally described in 1941 as Poecilichthys kanawhae by Edward Cowdenbeath Raney with the type locality given as the North Fork of the New River on North Carolina Highway 16 at Crumpler, Ashe County, North Carolina.

References

Freshwater fish of the United States
Etheostoma
Fish described in 1941
Taxonomy articles created by Polbot